The 2016 Alaska Senate election were held on Tuesday, November 8, 2016, with the primary election on August 16, 2016. Voters in the 10 districts of the Alaska Senate elected their representatives. The elections coincided with the elections for other offices, including for U.S. President and the state assembly.

Overview

Results

District B

District D

District F

District H

District J

District L

District N

District P

District R

District T

References 

2016 Alaska elections
2016
Alaska State Senate